L'hôpital means "The Hospital" in French.

L'Hôpital may refer to:

Places
 Lhôpital, a commune in the Ain department, France
 L'Hôpital, Moselle, a commune in the Moselle department, France

People
 Michel de L'Hôpital (–1573), French humanist and politician
 Guillaume de l'Hôpital (1661–1704), French mathematician

Other uses
 L'Hôpital's rule, a theorem in mathematics developed in 1696 by Johann Bernoulli and presented to and named after Guillaume de l'Hôpital

See also
 Hospitalier, a Christian order of French knights
 Hospital (disambiguation)